Giambattista Pittoni or Giovanni Battista Pittoni (6 June 1687 – 6 November 1767) was a Venetian painter of the late Baroque or Rococo period. He was among the founders of the Academy of Fine Arts of Venice, of which in 1758 he became the second president, succeeding Tiepolo.

Biography
Pittoni was born in Venice on 6 June 1687. He studied under his uncle Francesco Pittoni, a well-known but undistinguished painter of the Venetian Baroque; a Samson and Delilah at the Villa Querini in Visinale, near Pasiano di Pordenone, is signed by both painters. The theory of  that Pittoni studied under Antonio Balestra is now generally discounted.

Pittoni was unwilling to leave Venice and travelled little; although he received many foreign commissions, no journey in connection with any of them is documented, while from 1720 onwards records show that he was in Venice in every year. However, in 1720 he may have travelled to France with his uncle Francesco, together with Rosalba Carriera, Antonio Pellegrini and Anton Maria Zanetti. His change of style from a heavy Baroque to a lighter and more delicate Rococo manner dates from about this time; some older writers have attributed this change to an indirect French influence, perhaps through Pellegrini or through Sebastiano Ricci.

Pittoni joined the Fraglia dei Pittori Veneziani, the Venetian guild of painters, in 1716. From, probably, the same year until his death he was a member of the Collegio dei Pittori, of which he became prior in 1729. He was elected to the Accademia Clementina of Bologna in 1727. In 1750 he was one of the forty-six founding members of the Veneta Pubblica Accademia di Pittura, Scultura e Architettura, which later became the Accademia di Belle Arti di Venezia; from 1758 to 1760 he succeeded Tiepolo as president of the academy, and was elected for a second term in 1763–64.

Pittoni died in Venice on 6 November 1767. His tomb is in the church of San Giacomo dell'Orio, Venice.

Works

The catalogue raisonné by Franca Zava Boccazzi of Pittoni's paintings lists 247 extant and 117 lost, missing or destroyed works. The catalogue raisonné by Alice Binion of his drawings includes 304 items.

Patronage and reception

Pittoni had a high reputation during his lifetime, both within the Italian peninsula and elsewhere in Europe. Among his foreign patrons were Augustus II of Poland (a Death of Agrippina and a Death of Seneca, circa 1713, formerly in Dresden, now destroyed); an unknown patron who in the 1730s bought five altarpieces for St. Mary's Church, Kraków; Clemens August of Bavaria (St. Elizabeth Distributing Alms to the Poor, 1734, for the castle of Bad Mergentheim); Wilhelmine Amalia of Brunswick-Lüneburg, who at about the same time commissioned an Education of the Virgin and  a St. John Nepomuk for the chapel of Schloss Schönbrunn in Vienna; Philip V of Spain, who in 1735 commissioned a Triumphal Entry of Alexander into Babylonia for the Palacio Real de La Granja de San Ildefonso; and Augustus III of Poland, who through Francesco Algarotti commissioned a Crassus in the Sanctuary of the Temple of Jerusalem in 1743.

He was also much in demand in Italy, and supplied altarpieces for churches in Bergamo, Brescia, Milan, Padova, Verona and Vicenza. He was a skillful restorer of older paintings; he was often selected as restorer or inspector of the quadri pubblici, the state-owned paintings of the Serenissima. He sold nine paintings to the soldier-turned-collector Johann Matthias von der Schulenburg, but also advised him both on art and on art restoration. Pittoni was successful, well liked and well respected.

His reputation rapidly faded after his death, and by the end of the eighteenth century he was totally forgotten. Interest in him was revived in the twentieth century by the publications of Laura Coggiola Pittoni, beginning with Dei Pittoni, Artisti Veneti in 1907.

References
{{reflist|refs=

<ref name=eliot>Eliot Wooldridge Rowlands (1996). [https://books.google.com/books?id=y6bqAAAAMAAJ The collections of The Nelson-Atkins Museum of Art: Italian paintings, 1300-1800]. Kansas City, MO: Nelson-Atkins Museum of Art.</ref>

}}

 Further reading 

 Pellegrino Antonio Orlandi (annotated by P. Guarienti) (1753). Abecedario pittorico.
 Alessandro Longhi (1762). Compendio delle vite de' pittori veneziani istorici più rinomati del presente secolo con suoi ritratti tratti dal naturale. Venezia: the author.
 Antonio Maria Zanetti (1771). Della pittura veneziana e delle opere pubbliche de veneziani maestri libri V (in Italian). Venezia: Stamperia di G. Albrizzi.
 Laura Coggiola Pittoni (1921). G. B. Pittoni Firenze: Istituto di edizioni artistiche.
  (1933) Pseudo influenza francese nell'arte di Giambattista Pittoni. Rivista di Venezia 11: 399–412.
 M. Goering (1934). Die Tätigkeit der Venezianer Maler Piazzetta und Pittoni für den Kurfürsten Clemens August von Köln. Westfalen: Hefte für Geschichte, Kunst und Volkskunde 19: 364–72.
 Rodolfo Pallucchini (1945). I disegni di Giambattista Pittoni. [Padova]: Le Tre Venezie.
 Klàra Garas (1969). Anton Kern (1710–1747). In: Kazimierz Michałowski, Jan Białostocki (eds.) (1969). Muzeum i twórca: Studia z historii sztuki i kultury ku czci Stanisława Lorentza''. Warszawa: Państwowe Wydawnictwo naukowe. 
 Alice Binion (1970). From Schulenburgs Gallery and Records. 'Burlington Magazine 112: 297–303.
 Franca Zava Boccazzi (1974). Per il catalogo di Giambattista Pittoni: Proposte e inediti. Arte Veneta 28: 179–204.
  (1975). Nota sulla grafica di Antonio Kern. Arte Veneta 29: 246–51.
  (1975). Pitture mitologiche di Giambattista Pittoni in rapporto a Sebastiano Ricci. Atti del Congresso internazionale di studi su Sebastiano Ricci e il suo tempo 1: 46–51.
 Barbara Mazza (1976). La vicenda dei Tombeaux des princes: Matrici, storia e fortuna della serie Swiny tra Bologna e Venezia. Saggi e memorie di storia dell'arte 10:  79, 81-102, 141-151.
 Franca Zava Boccazzi (1977). Due nuove micropitture di Giambattista Pittoni. In: [Maria Cionini Visani] (1977).Per Maria Cionini Visani: Scritti di amici. Torino: G. Canale. 118–21
 Alice Binion (1981). Anton Kern in Venice. Münchner Jahrbuch der bildenden Kunst 32: 182–206.
  (1981). Three New Mythological Paintings by Giambattista Pittoni. Burlington Magazine 123: 96–99.
 George Knox (1985). Piazzetta, Pittoni and Tiepolo at Parma. Arte Veneta 39: 114–24.
 Adriano Mariuz, Giuseppe Pavanello (1985). I primi affreschi di Giambattista Tiepolo. Arte Veneta'' 39''': 101–13.

1687 births
1767 deaths
17th-century Italian painters
Italian male painters
18th-century Italian painters
Painters from Venice
Italian Baroque painters
Rococo painters
18th-century Italian male artists